Nathan Goff Jr. House is a former historic home located at Clarksburg, Harrison County, West Virginia.  It was built between 1880 and 1883, and was a three-story brick dwelling in a combined Queen Anne / Second Empire style.  It featured a slate-covered mansard roof.  It was the home of Nathan Goff Jr. (1843–1920) and his son Guy D. Goff (1866–1933), who both served as United States senators from West Virginia.

It was listed on the National Register of Historic Places in 1976.  It was delisted in 1994, after demolition in 1993.

References 

Former National Register of Historic Places in West Virginia
Second Empire architecture in West Virginia
Queen Anne architecture in West Virginia
Houses completed in 1880
Houses in Harrison County, West Virginia
Demolished buildings and structures in West Virginia
Buildings and structures in Clarksburg, West Virginia